Ignazio Dolce (born 26 March 1933) is an Italian director and actor.

Life and career 
Born in Palermo, Sicily, Dolce graduated at Centro Sperimentale di Cinematografia, and starting from the late 1950s he began a career as a character actor.  Almost simultaneously he started a parallel career as a second unit director, often collaborating with Gianfranco Parolini and Antonio Margheriti. He debuted as a director in 1975 with the black comedy L'ammazzatina, and in the late 1980s he specialized in low-budget war films, being usually credited as Paul D. Robinson.

Partial filmography
 Tough Guys (1960)
 The Best of Enemies (1961)
 Last Platoon (1988)

References

External links 
 

1933 births
20th-century Italian people
Italian film directors
Italian male film actors
Male actors from Palermo
Living people
Centro Sperimentale di Cinematografia alumni
Film people from Palermo